Where the Wild Things Are is a 2009 fantasy adventure drama film directed by Spike Jonze. Written by Jonze and Dave Eggers, it is based on Maurice Sendak's 1963 children's book of the same name. It combines live-action, performers in costumes, animatronics, and computer-generated imagery (CGI). The film stars Max Records, Catherine Keener, and Mark Ruffalo, and features the voices of Lauren Ambrose, Chris Cooper, James Gandolfini, Catherine O'Hara, and Forest Whitaker. The film centers on a lonely young boy named Max who sails away to an island inhabited by creatures known as the "Wild Things", who declare Max their king.

In the early 1980s, The Walt Disney Company considered adapting the film as a blend of traditionally animated characters and computer-generated environments, but development did not go past a test film to see how the animation hybridizing would result. In 2001, Universal Studios acquired rights to the book's adaptation and initially attempted to develop a computer-animated adaptation with Disney animator Eric Goldberg, but the CGI concept was replaced with a live-action one in 2003, and Goldberg was dropped for Jonze. The film was produced by Tom Hanks, Gary Goetzman, Sendak, John Carls, and Vincent Landay, and made with an estimated budget of $100 million. Where the Wild Things Are was a joint production between Australia, Germany, and the United States, and was filmed principally in Melbourne.

Where the Wild Things Are was released on 16 October 2009, in the United States, on 3 December in Australia, and on 17 December in Germany. Despite concerns from within Warner Bros. and news outlets leading up to release over whether or not Jonze's approach to the film was suitable for children, the film was met with positive reviews and appeared on many year-end top ten lists. However, the film was a financial disappointment, grossing just $100 million against a production budget of $100 million. The film was released on DVD and Blu-ray on 2 March 2010.

Plot
Max is a lonely 9-year-old boy with an active imagination and divorced parents. His older sister, Claire, does nothing when her friends crush Max's snow fort with him inside during a snowball fight. Out of frustration, Max messes up her bedroom and destroys a frame he made for her. Later, his mother, Connie, invites her boyfriend Adrian to dinner. Max becomes upset with her for not coming to the fort he made in his room. Wearing his wolf suit, he begins to wreak havoc among the house. As Connie scolds him, he acts up and bites her on the shoulder. She yells at him and he runs away, scared by what transpired. At the edge of a pond, Max finds a small boat that he boards.

Eventually, Max reaches an island that is home to a group of seven large monsters called the Wild Things - namely, Carol, Ira, Judith, Alexander, Douglas, the Bull, and KW. Carol is in the middle of a destructive tantrum caused by the departure of KW. Max tries joining in on the mayhem, but finds himself facing the suspicious anger of the Wild Things. When they contemplate eating him, Max convinces them that he is a king with magical powers capable of bringing harmony to the group. They crown him as their new king. Shortly after, KW returns, and Max declares a "wild rumpus" in which the Wild Things smash trees and tackle each other, before going to sleep in a pile with Max at the center.

Carol takes Max on a tour of the island, showing him a model he built depicting what he wishes the island looked like. Inspired by this, Max orders the construction of an enormous fort. When KW brings her two owl friends, Bob and Terry, to the fort, a disagreement ensues as Carol feels they are outsiders. To release their frustrations, Max divides the tribe into "good guys" and "bad guys" for a dirt clod fight. However, Alexander is injured during the game, and Carol berates KW for jokingly stepping on his head, prompting the latter to leave once again.

Max finds Alexander alone in the fort, whereupon he reveals that he knows Max is not a king with magical powers, but warns him never to let Carol know. However, Douglas reveals the truth when Carol throws another tantrum in the middle of the night over the state of the fort and Max's failure to fulfill his duties as a king. Enraged, Carol rips off Douglas's right arm - though only sand pours from the wound - before chasing Max into the forest and attempting to eat him. Max is saved by KW, who hides him in her stomach. After Carol leaves, KW explains to Max how difficult their lives are, with Carol's tantrums only making matters worse. Max realizes what his mother is going through and decides to leave the island.

Max finds the crushed remains of Carol's model island and leaves a token of affection for him to find. Max finds Carol and tells him he is going home because he is not a king. The other Wild Things escort Max to his boat. Carol runs to join them after finding Max's token and arrives in time to see him off. He starts to howl and Max howls back; all the other Wild Things join in. Carol looks at KW, and she smiles kindly at him. Returning home, Max is embraced by his mother, who gives him a bowl of soup, a piece of cake, and a glass of milk. She sits with him as he eats and he watches as she falls asleep at the table.

Cast

Live action
 Max Records as Max, a lonely boy with a wild imagination.
 Catherine Keener as Connie, Max's mother.
 Mark Ruffalo as Adrian, Connie's boyfriend.
 Pepita Emmerichs as Claire, Max's older sister.
 Steve Mouzakis as Max's teacher.
 Max Pfeifer, Madeleine Greaves, Joshua Jay, and Ryan Corr as Claire's friends.

Voice cast
 James Gandolfini as Carol, the impulsive and short-tempered leader of the Wild Things. 
 Lauren Ambrose as KW, the loner of the group. 
 Chris Cooper as Douglas, a cockatoo-like peace-keeper Wild Thing who is Carol's best friend. 
 Forest Whitaker as Ira, a gentle and soft-spoken Wild Thing.
 Catherine O'Hara as Judith, a three-horned lion-like Wild Thing who is Ira's aggressive and loud girlfriend. 
 Paul Dano as Alexander, a goat-like Wild Thing who is constantly ignored, belittled and mistreated. 
 Michael Berry Jr. as Bernard The Bull, an intimidating and quiet bull-like Wild Thing who keeps to himself and rarely speaks.
 Spike Jonze as Bob and Terry, two owls that are KW's friends.

Suit performers
 Vincent Crowley as Carol
 Alice Parkinson as KW
 John Leary as Douglas
 Sam Longley as Ira
 Nick Farnell as Judith
 Sonny Gerasimowicz as Alexander
 Angus Sampson as The Bull

Production

Development
Where the Wild Things Are started its development life in the early 1980s, originally to be an animated feature by Disney that would have blended traditionally animated characters with computer-generated settings. Animators Glen Keane and John Lasseter (who later moved on to Pixar Animation Studios) had completed a test film to see how the animation hybridising would work out, but the project proceeded no further. Sendak and producer John B. Carls later formed Wild Things Productions in 1992, with the intent to produce adaptations of Sendak's properties. Universal Studios and Playtone acquired rights to the book's adaptation in 1999, initially attempting to develop a live-action/CGI adaptation with Gore Verbinski attached to direct and Eric Warren Singer attached to write the screenplay. In 2001, Universal replaced the live-action/CGI concept with a fully computer-animated adaptation, with Disney animator Eric Goldberg attached to direct, but in 2003 they reverted back to live-action, and Goldberg was replaced with Spike Jonze.

After years of interest from various producers, Sendak favoured Spike Jonze as director, noting he was "young, interesting and had a spark that none of the others had". The film was originally set for release from Universal, and a teaser of the film was attached to the studio's 2000 adaptation of How the Grinch Stole Christmas. Disagreements between Universal and Sendak over Jonze's approach to the story led to a turnaround arrangement where the film's production was transferred to Warner Bros.

In 2005, Jonze and Dave Eggers completed a 111-page screenplay, expanding the original thirteen-sentence story. On 8 July 2006, production began open auditions for the role of Max. The process took months, but, eventually, Max Records was cast. Academy Award-winning make-up effects supervisor Howard Berger (The Chronicles of Narnia) turned down offers to work on the film four times. Although the book inspired him as a child to work in special effects, he felt filming it was a "horrible idea." Jim Henson's Creature Shop provided the animatronic suits for the Wild Things.

Jonze kept in close consultation with Sendak throughout the process, and the author approved creature designs created by Jim Henson's Creature Shop. To make the set a more comfortable environment for Max Records, Jonze encouraged the crew members to bring their children to the set. Some of them can be seen in the film's classroom scene.

Michelle Williams was originally cast as the female Wild Thing KW only to leave the project after her voice "didn't match the original vision of how the Wild Thing should sound". She was replaced by Lauren Ambrose, and filming continued.

Filming
Principal photography began in July 2006 at Docklands Studios Melbourne in Melbourne, Australia and wrapped in December 2006.

In 2008, test footage was leaked onto the internet, garnering mixed reactions. Jonze called the footage "a very early test... to see if our VFX plan for the faces would work," but early fan outcry over the video, along with rumored "scared children" in test audiences led Warner Bros. to delay the film's release for a year from its original 3 October 2008 release date. On 20 February 2008, speculation emerged that Warner Bros. was considering reshooting the entire film.

Then-WB president Alan F. Horn responded, "We've given him more money and, even more importantly, more time for him to work on the film. We'd like to find a common ground that represents Spike's vision but still offers a film that really delivers for a broad-based audience. No one wants to turn this into a bland, sanitized studio movie. This is a very special piece of material, and we're just trying to get it right." Producer Gary Goetzman followed, "We support Spike's vision. We're helping him make the vision he wants to make."

At the end of 2008, Jonze got together with Framestore in London to complete his film and work with them to bring to life the performances through their animation and visual effects team. Over the course of the next six months, Jonze spent time with the animators on the floor of the studio as they worked together to realise his intention for the performances that had started many years before with the voices, continued with the suit performances in Australia, and were completed in London's Soho. He also reshot several scenes and added three new ones, bringing the film's cost up from the original greenlit $75 million to $100 million.

Music

For the film's trailer, Arcade Fire provided a re-recorded version of the track "Wake Up" from their album Funeral. The new version is not featured in the actual film or the soundtrack and has never been made available to the public.

During the film, various songs can be heard such as "Hideaway", "Rumpus", "Worried Shoes" and "All is Love" by Karen O, Zahida K, Anisa R K and the Kids.

Reception

Box office

The studio decided not to position the film as a children's movie and spent 70% of the advertising on broad-based and adult-driven promotion.
The film was released in North America in both conventional and IMAX theatres on 16 October 2009. Early Friday box office estimates show the film earned about $32.7 million on its opening weekend in theaters. It grossed $77.2 million during its theatrical run in the U.S. and Canada, plus $22.8 million internationally. Overall, the studio took a loss as the final budget of the movie was estimated to be around $100 million.

Internationally, the film was released in Australia on 4 December 2009; in Ireland and the UK on 11 December 2009; and in Germany on 17 December 2009.
It was released in Russia on 4 February 2010.

Critical response

On review website Rotten Tomatoes the film holds an approval rating of 73% based on 270 reviews, with an average rating of 7/10. The site's critical consensus reads: "Some may find its dark tone and slender narrative off-putting, but Spike Jonze's heartfelt adaptation of the classic children's book is as beautiful as it is uncompromising." Metacritic assigned the film a weighted average score of 71 out of 100 based on 37 critics, indicating "generally favorable reviews". Audiences surveyed by CinemaScore gave the film an average grade of "B+" on scale of A+ to F.

Lisa Schwarzbaum of Entertainment Weekly gave the film an A, declaring the film "one of the year's best." Manohla Dargis of the New York Times wrote that Spike Jonze's "filmmaking exceeds anything he's done" before, while also noting the imaginative visuals and otherworldly feel, along with the fantastic creature effects on the "Wild Things". Peter Travers of Rolling Stone gave the film four stars saying, "For all the money spent, the film's success is best measured by its simplicity and the purity of its innovation." Roger Ebert awarded the film three stars out of four, saying, "All the same, the film will play better for older audiences remembering a much-loved book from childhood, and not as well with kids who have been trained on slam-bam action animation." Dan Jolin of Empire Magazine gave the film a four out of five stars, saying, "A film for anyone who's ever climbed trees, grassed knees or basked in the comfort of a parents sympathy as they've pulled you off the ground crying. It'll make your inner child run wild".

Some critics have noted the movie's dark adaptation for children, such as David Denby from The New Yorker saying, "I have a vision of eight-year-olds leaving the movie in bewilderment. Why are the creatures so unhappy?" Stephanie Zacharek of Salon.com criticized the film's visual aspect, "Even the look of the picture becomes tiresome after a while — it starts to seem depressive and shaggy and tired." She also stated that "The movie is so loaded with adult ideas about childhood — as opposed to things that might delight or engage an actual child." The Globe and Mails Liam Lacey branded the production a "self-consciously sad film."

Critic A.O. Scott named the film the best of 2009 and placed it at number five on his list of top ten movies of the decade.

Suitability for children
Warner Bros. initially feared that the film was not family friendly and would frighten children, but these fears were not shared by Jonze or Sendak. Jonze refused to compromise, and Maurice Sendak said after having seen a completed cut of the film, "I've never seen a movie that looked or felt like this. And it's [Spike Jonze's] personal 'this.' And he's not afraid of himself. He's a real artist that lets it come through in the work. So he's touched me. He's touched me very much." After seeing the finished product, a Warner Bros. executive stated of Jonze, "He's a perfectionist and just kept working on it, but now we know that at the end of the day he nailed it."

Film classification agencies have tended to assign "parental guidance" ratings rather than general or family ratings. MPAA in the United States assessed a PG rating "for mild thematic elements, some adventure action, and brief language". A PG rating was also declared in the United Kingdom by BBFC, citing "mild threat and brief violence". In Canada, the film also received a PG rating in Ontario with an alert for frightening scenes while Quebec awarded a General rating. British Columbia also assessed the film with a G rating with a proviso that it "may frighten young children". In Ireland the film has been classified PG because of what is claimed as having "mild" violence Similarly in South Africa, the film received a PG rating with a consumer content Violence indicator, noting there were "moments of mildish menace and poignant themes." Australia also applied a PG rating to the film and noted "mild violence and scary scenes".

The movie's release generated conflicting views over whether it is harmful to expose children to frightening scenes. Jonze indicated that his goal was "to make a movie about childhood" rather than to create a children's movie. Dan Fellman, Warner Brothers' head of movie distribution, noted that the film's promotion was not directed towards children, advising parents to exercise their own discretion. In an interview with Newsweek, Sendak stated that parents who deemed the film's content to be too disturbing for children should "go to hell. That's a question I will not tolerate" and he further noted "I saw the most horrendous movies that were unfit for child's eyes. So what? I managed to survive."

Home media

The film was released as a Blu-ray/DVD/Digital copy combo pack and on DVD on 2 March 2010. The home media release was accompanied by a Canadian-produced live-action/animated short film adaptation of another Sendak work, Higglety Pigglety Pop! or There Must Be More to Life, produced especially for the Blu-ray edition.

Merchandise

Video game

A video game based on the film was released on 13 October 2009, for the PlayStation 3, Xbox 360, Wii, and Nintendo DS. The former three were developed by Griptonite Games, and the latter by WayForward. All were published by Warner Bros. Games.

Skateboards and limited edition shoes
To coincide with the film's release, Girl Skateboards (which Jonze co-owns) came out with seven pro-model skateboards with the Wild Things as the board graphics. Lakai shoes also re-designed most of their pro-model and stock shoes and added in different colors, adding in pictures of the Wild Things on the side and on others with Where the Wild Things Are printed on the side.
UGG Australia also designed limited-edition Where the Wild Things Are boots.

Toys
A series of collectible vinyl dolls of the Wild Things and Max was released from the Japanese company MediCom Toys. Other releases include an eight-inch articulated figure of Max in wolf costume and smaller scale sets of the characters released under their Kubrick figure banner.

Novelization
McSweeney's published The Wild Things by Dave Eggers, a full-length novel based on the film adaptation.

References

External links

 
 
 
 
 
 
 
 
 

2009 films
2000s fantasy drama films
2000s fantasy adventure films
Adaptations of works by Maurice Sendak
American adventure drama films
American children's adventure films
American children's drama films
American children's fantasy films
American fantasy adventure films
American fantasy drama films
Australian children's adventure films
Australian children's drama films
Australian children's fantasy films
Australian adventure drama films
Australian fantasy films
English-language German films
Films based on children's books
Films directed by Spike Jonze
Puppet films
Films produced by Gary Goetzman
Films produced by Tom Hanks
Films scored by Carter Burwell
Films shot in Melbourne
Films set on fictional islands
German adventure drama films
German children's films
German fantasy adventure films
IMAX films
Legendary Pictures films
Playtone films
Films with screenplays by Dave Eggers
Films with screenplays by Spike Jonze
Village Roadshow Pictures films
Warner Bros. films
2000s children's films
2009 drama films
Magic realism films
2000s English-language films
2000s American films
2000s German films